Mallika is an Indian given name.

Mallika may also refer to:

 Mallika-E-Kitchen, an Indian cookery television series
 Mallika (1957 film), Tamil language film
 Mallika (mango), a mango cultivar
 Mallika (2010 film), directed by Wilson Louis
 Mallika jacksoni, a butterfly species

See also
 Malika (disambiguation)